Poseidon's Gold is a 1993 historical mystery crime novel by Lindsey Davis and the fifth installment of the Marcus Didius Falco Mysteries series.  Set in Rome during AD 72, the novel stars Marcus Didius Falco, informer and imperial agent. The gold in the title refers to the treasure, taken by Falco's brother Festus for one of Festus' wild schemes and which now appears to have gone down with the ship, returning to Poseidon.

Plot summary 

In Poseidon's Gold, Falco returns from a six-month mission to Germania Liberia, only to become embroiled in the after-effects of a scam by his now-deceased, older brother Festus. The story recounts shipping scams, crooked antiques auctions, and hired thugs, all while Falco is trying to clear his family's name and sort out Festus' business dealings.

Characters in Poseidon's Gold

Main characters 
 Decimus Camillus Verus - Senatorial father of Helena Justina.
 Helena Justina - Daughter of the Senator Decimus Camillus Verus
 Julia Justa - Wife of Decimus Camillus Verus and mother of Helena
 Junilla Tacita - Mother of Falco
 Lucius Petronius Longus - Investigator for the vigiles and friend of Falco
 Marcus Didius Favonius (aka Geminus) - Auctioneer and Father of Falco
 Marcus Didius Falco - Informer and Imperial Agent from the Aventine.

Other characters 
 Anacrites - Imperial spy
 Apollonius - An ex-geometry teacher
 Cocceius - Auctioneer
 Domitian Caesar - Youngest son of the Emperor
 Epimandos - A waiter
 Lenia - A Laundress
 Manilus - A painter
 Marponius - A trial judge and encyclopedia salesman
 Orontes Mediolanus - A sculptor
 Rubina - An artist's model
 Varga - A painter

Major themes 

 Investigation into the murky business dealings of Marcus Didius Festus and the fight to clear the family name.
 Developing relationship of Marcus Didius Falco and Helena Justina.

Allusions/references to actual history, geography and current science 
 Set in Rome in AD 72, during the reign of Emperor Vespasian.

Allusions/references to other works 
 The novel ends on a somewhat elaborate joke.  The Judean slaves attempt to send Falco on a quest to recover a missing artifact.  At first, Falco is afraid that they want him to raid the treasures brought back after the conquest.  However, they then tell Falco that they want him to look for a "Lost Ark".  Falco demurs, and says someone who is more of a daredevil than he would have to perform that particular quest, alluding to Indiana Jones and the Raiders of the Lost Ark.

Publication details 
 1993, UK, Century Hardback (out of print)
 1994, UK, Arrow, Paperback 
 1995, US, Crown/Ballantine 
 1999, UK, Arrow, Paperback  (as part of single-volume omnibus edition, Falco on his Metal, with Venus in Copper and The Iron Hand of Mars)

Adaptations in other media 
 BBC Radio 4 starring Anton Lesser and Anna Madeley, in May 2009. Unlike previous Radio 4 dramatisations of novels from the Falco series (in four or six half-hour episodes), this adaptation was broadcast as ten 15-minute episodes as the Woman's Hour Drama. This installment added Trevor Peacock to the recurring cast, as Geminus.

References

External links 
lindseydavis.co.uk Author's Official Website

1993 British novels
Marcus Didius Falco novels
Historical novels
72
Century (imprint) books